The Alphabet From A to Y with Bonus Letter Z! is a children's book aimed at infants and preschoolers containing couplets written by comedian, writer, and humorist Steve Martin, with illustrations by New Yorker cartoonist Roz Chast.

The book, published by Doubleday, was released in October 2007.

Alphabet books
American picture books
2007 children's books
Doubleday (publisher) books
Books by Steve Martin